The  is a newspaper in Yokohama, Japan covering general news.

In February 2005 the website of Kanagawa Shimbun was relaunched, and an online blog, Kanaloco, was started.

References

Further reading

External links
Kanagawa Shimbun (Japanese)

Mass media in Yokohama
Mass media in Kanagawa Prefecture
Newspapers published in Japan
Publications with year of establishment missing